Craig Phillip Robinson (born October 25, 1971) is an American actor and comedian. He is best known for portraying Darryl Philbin on The Office (2005–2013). He also portrayed LeVar "Freight Train" Brown on The Cleveland Show (2009–2013), and Doug "the Pontiac Bandit" Judy on Brooklyn Nine-Nine (2013–2021). He also frequently collaborates with Seth Rogen, including the films Pineapple Express (2008), Zack and Miri Make a Porno (2008), This Is the End (2013), and Sausage Party (2016). Robinson has appeared in numerous other television shows and films, including Hot Tub Time Machine (2010), Get on Up (2014), An Evening with Beverly Luff Linn (2018), and Dolemite Is My Name (2019), as well as voicing characters in films such as Shrek Forever After (2010) and The Bad Guys (2022), as well as others. He was nominated for the Independent Spirit Award for Best Supporting Male for his performance in the film Morris from America.

From 2020 to 2021, Robinson hosted the reality dancing show The Masked Dancer. He also has appeared in commercials for Pizza Hut, Dietz & Watson, Walmart, Dodge Motors, and Gain detergent. Since 2022, Robinson stars and executive produces the Peacock series Killing It.

Early life 
Robinson was born on October 25, 1971, in Chicago, Illinois, to a music teacher mother and an attorney father. He was raised on the South Side of Chicago, and was brought up Methodist. He attended Whitney M. Young Magnet High School. He received his undergraduate degree from Illinois State University in 1994, and his Master of Education from Saint Xavier University. He was a music teacher at Horace Mann Elementary School in Chicago, and Benjamin Franklin Elementary School in Hammond, Indiana and East Chicago Central High School in East Chicago, Indiana.

Career

Acting and comedy 
Robinson began doing stand-up and taking classes in improv and acting at The Second City in Chicago while still in college. He was on Def Comedy Jam season 7, episode 2. After doing open-mic sessions in New York, Chicago, Los Angeles and elsewhere and winning regional comedy competitions, he began to get spots on late night TV shows like Jimmy Kimmel Live. 2004 saw him cast in bit parts, including episodes of Friends, The Bernie Mac Show, LAX and Arrested Development. Those led to small film roles in Knocked Up, Pineapple Express and Walk Hard: The Dewey Cox Story.

Beginning in 2005, he portrayed Darryl Philbin on the American version of The Office, appearing first in "The Alliance", the fourth episode of the first season. Robinson was promoted to a starring role in the fourth season and continued until the show ended in 2013.

In 2010, he hosted season seven of Last Comic Standing with judges Greg Giraldo, Natasha Leggero, and Andy Kindler.

He has appeared on other television shows, including Brooklyn Nine-Nine, Lucky, Halfway Home, and Reno 911!. He appeared in the music video for the Red Hot Chili Peppers song "Hump de Bump". He voiced Cookie in Shrek Forever After (2010) and played Reg Mackworthy on the HBO hit series Eastbound & Down (2009–2012).

Robinson is a frequent collaborator with Seth Rogen, starring alongside Rogen in the films Knocked Up (2007), Pineapple Express (2008), Zack and Miri Make a Porno (2008), This Is the End (2013), Sausage Party (2016), as well as the miniseries Santa Inc. (2021).

Robinson performed at the Just for Laughs Comedy Festival in 2008.

In addition to Shrek Forever After and Sausage Party, Robinson has also provided his voice for the films Escape from Planet Earth (2013), Percy Jackson: Sea of Monsters (2013), Henchmen (2018), and Dolittle (2020).

He also appeared in the Korean film D-War (Korean: 디워), released in North America as Dragon Wars: D-War in 2007.

Around 2014, Robinson portrayed a farmer in commercials for the mobile game Hay Day.

Making a departure from his comedy background, Robinson portrayed saxophonist Maceo Parker in the James Brown biopic Get On Up (2014). In December 2015, he appeared in several Wal-Mart commercials promoting their credit card while singing and playing the piano at the store. He received rave reviews for the A24 drama Morris from America (2016), earning a nomination for the Independent Spirit Award for Best Supporting Male. He also played the role of Ray Hayworth in the second season of the drama series Mr. Robot. In 2018 he had a lead role playing the title character in the crime comedy film An Evening with Beverly Luff Linn.

In 2019 Robinson became the spokesman for the Philadelphia-area meat producer Dietz & Watson, appearing in several commercials for the company's line of deli meats. The first of these commercials aired in January 2019, featuring Robinson and his brother Chris promoting the snack Dietz Nuts with Robinson playing up the double entendre in the name of the product.

In June 2020, Robinson was reportedly confirmed to be starring in the pandemic-themed thriller produced by Michael Bay Songbird alongside Demi Moore, Peter Stormare and Paul Walter Hauser.

Robinson was a guest judge in season four of The Masked Singer where he also performed Gloria Gaynor's "I Will Survive" as a "Mystery Piano Man" during his introduction.

Robinson later became the host of The Masked Dancer which has the same format as The Masked Singer. In 2021, Robinson was featured as a spokesperson for Pizza Hut advertising the return of their Detroit Styled Pizza and Original Stuffed Crust Pizza. Robinson also voiced a singing bust in Muppets Haunted Mansion.

In 2021, he started doing commercials for Gain detergent, singing a parody of "Maniac" by Michael Sembello.

His next series, Killing It, premiered on Peacock in April 2022 and he voiced Mr. Shark, in the 2022 DreamWorks Animation film The Bad Guys.

Music 

For a number of years, Robinson and comedian Jerry Minor had a comedy act where they performed as musical duo L. Witherspoon & Chucky, with Minor as smooth singing L. Witherspoon and Robinson as Chucky, the keyboard player and back-up singer. They performed the act on HBO's Sketch Pad, several stand-up shows on Comedy Central, Real Time with Bill Maher, and Jimmy Kimmel Live!

He occasionally performs with his band, The Nasty Delicious, alongside his brother and musical director Chris Rob on keyboards, Ethan Farmer on bass, Asa Watkins on drums, David Sampson on guitar, Lakecia Benjamin and Reggie Hines on saxophones, Winston Byrd on trumpet, and Bendji Allonce on percussion. They were featured as his band in an episode of The Office, and on the season finale of the seventh season of Last Comic Standing. He has also performed in character in multiple episodes of The Office, and was featured on the Hot Tub Time Machine soundtrack, singing "Jessie's Girl" and "Let's Get It Started". He was in the film Miss March, playing the role of the hit rapper Phil, also known as Horsedick.MPEG. Robinson produced two songs from that same film.

He has performed with his band in the 2018 stand-up comedy special Seth Rogen's Hilarity for Charity.

Filmography

Film

Television

References

External links 

 
 Craig Robinson at TV.com

1971 births
21st-century American male actors
21st-century American comedians
African-American male actors
African-American male comedians
American male comedians
American comedy musicians
American male film actors
American male television actors
American male voice actors
American stand-up comedians
Illinois State University alumni
Living people
Male actors from Chicago
Saint Xavier University alumni
Whitney M. Young Magnet High School alumni
Comedians from Illinois
21st-century African-American people
Methodists from Illinois
The Nasty Delicious members